Kerry Peers (born 1 November 1964) is a British actress who is best known for her role in The Bill where she played Suzi Croft from 1993 to 1998. She has also been in Casualty, Doctors, Holby City, Brookside and appeared on  Coronation Street from October 2019 to January 2020.

Early life
Kerry Roberta Peers was born on 1 November 1964 in the small village of Northop Hall, near Mold in North Wales, where she spent her childhood.

Acting
Peers moved to London, where she attended the Central School of Speech and Drama. On leaving drama school she performed in a number of plays, such as Les liaisons dangereuses (with the Royal Shakespeare Company) and was also in the original cast of Alan Ayckbourn's Mr A's Amazing Maze Plays at the Stephen Joseph Theatre in Scarborough.

Between 1993 and 1998, Peers joined thecast of The Bill as DC Suzi Croft. Since then she has continued to appear on television in series such as Waterloo Road, Casualty, Holby City,  The Case, Doctors, The Royal Today and Shameless. She was also a regular cast member of Brookside 2002–2003, playing the part of Helen Carey. In November 2019, she appeared in an episode of the BBC soap opera Doctors as Yvette Froom.

Peers has also continued to appear on-stage, playing Nurse Ratched in an acclaimed version of One Flew Over the Cuckoo's Nest as well as roles in Paradise Bound and Billy Liar.

In 2003, Peers won the Manchester Evening News Theatre Award for Best Actress in a Supporting Actress Role for her part in Neil Simon's Brighton Beach Memoirs at the Oldham Coliseum Theatre.

References

External links
  from Internet Movie Database.

British television actresses
British soap opera actresses
1964 births
Living people
People from Northop